Fénétrange (Lorraine Franconian: Finschtinge) is a commune in the Moselle department in Grand Est in north-eastern France.

Geography 
Fénétrange is located near the border between the Moselle department and the Alsace bossue. The river Saar flows through Fénétrange. The municipality is part of the Lorraine regional natural park.

Etymology 
Fénétrange means "dwellings on the edge of a bend". Its Latin name is Philestangia. It was Germanised into Vinstingen.

Previous names 
Filestengas (Xth century), Filistenges et Vinstringen (1070), Philistingis (1136), Phylestanges (1222), Finstingen (1323), Vinstingen (1328), Vinstinga (1340), Fenestranges (1433), Phinstingen (1558), Vinstringium (1675), Fénétrange (1793), Fénestrange (XIXth century), Finstingen (1871-1918)

History 
The name of Fénétrange was officially mentioned for the first time on 18 September 1070. More precisely in a document authorising the abbesses of Remiremont, who partly owned the domain, to mint coins in Fénétrange, in exchange for the payment of a fee.

In 1224, Merbode de Malberg became the first lord of Fénétrange.

During the Middle-Age, it used to be a fortified town reputed to be impregnable.

Sights 
 The Fénétrange castle, built during the Middle Age. It was later renovated during the 18th century. The building contains a medieval kitchen, a well, spiral stairs labelled "monument historique". It also contains a catholic gothic chapel constructed in 1584.
 The Saint-Rémy gothic collegiate church. It was labelled "monument historique" in 1930.
 The former synagogue
 The Lutheran Church
 The remains of the ramparts
 The former Bailiff's House
 The "Porte de France", an ancient fortified gate
 Oriel windows, located 78, rue de l'Hôpital and 35, rue des Juifs are labelled "monuments historiques".
 The bridge

Cultural events and festivities 
Since 1978, an annual music and gastronomy festival takes place in Fénétrange. It is known as "Festival de Fénétrange, musique et gastronomie"

Fénétrange is one of the few French localities where a night watchman still exists, thus perpetuating a medieval tradition. From July to September, the visitors can follow the watchman, in his medieval attire, during his night patrol.

Every year, from late November to early January, several winter festivities occur in Fénétrange. One of them, is the traditional Christmas market.

Notable People

Notable people born in Fénétrange 
 Johann Maria Philipp Frimont (1759-1831) a general of the Austrian Empire
 Charles Hyacinthe Leclerc de Landremont (1739-1818) commander in chief of the Army of the Rhine during the French Revolution
 Ernst Bogislaw von Croÿ (1620-1684) the last duke of Pomerania

Notable people related to Fénétrange 

 Charles Philippe de Croÿ (1549-1613) a Prince of the Holy Empire and a military as well as a politician from the Southern Netherlands. He became Baron of Fénétrange when he married Diane de Dommartin.
 Marcel Dassault (1892-1986) a French engineer and industrialist, whose family originally came from Fénétrange
 Johann Michael Moscherosch (1601-1669) a German statesman, writer and one of Fénétrange's former bailiffs.

See also 
 Communes of the Moselle department
 Parc naturel régional de Lorraine

References

External links 
 

Communes of Moselle (department)
Duchy of Lorraine